In Francoist Spain mandates in municipal councils were divided into three pools: in Tercio Familiar only so-called heads of family were entitled to vote, in Tercio Sindical the councillors were chosen in a phased system based on trade unions, and in Tercio de Entidades seats were filled also in a two-step way related to other organizations. Local elections were organized every three years, in each cycle voting for half of the mandates available in every ayuntamiento; from 1948 to 1973 the balloting took place nine times. The system was designed to ensure bureaucratic control of the electoral process and as such it proved largely successful. Electoral campaign was non-confrontational and presented as administrative, not political exercise. Until the 1970s around 45% of adults were entitled to vote, later the figure grew significantly.  The turnout is estimated to range from 80% during early Francoism to below 50% in its final stages.

Legal basis

The first general document regulating the regime of local elections was Ley de Bases de Régimen Local of 1945, in large part based on Estatuto Municipal prepared in 1924 by José Calvo Sotelo; it was detailed in a decree in 1950. Another decree of 1952 specified organization and modus operandi of local councils. In 1953 the 1945 Ley de Bases was replaced by a new one, in turn detailed in a decree of 1955. This set of documents remained in force until 1970, when it was appended by a new regulation. A third version of Ley de Bases de Régimen Local was adopted on November 19, 1975, few days before the death of Franco.

Frequency

Until 1948 municipalities were governed by Comisiones Gestoras, municipal bodies entirely appointed by the government and provincial civil governors. Since 1948 municipal elections were organized nine times, in 1948, 1951, 1954, 1957, 1960, 1963, 1966, 1970 and 1973. The unusually long 4-year term of 1966-1970 resulted from protracted works on new election regime, completed in 1970. Every time the elections were organized in late November and in a 2-week sequence: on the first Sunday of the cycle the vote fell on Tercio Familiar, on the second Sunday on Tercio Sindical and on the third Sunday on Tercio de Entidades; starting in 1970 elections were organized on a Tuesday, reportedly to increase the turnout.

General principles

Francoism adopted an organicist principle; it envisioned society not as a sum of individuals, but as a construction built of a number of traditional social entities. Accordingly, representation should be performed not on the basis of universal suffrage, but rather be exercised by means of so-called intermediary bodies. In case of municipalities this principle was embodied in the scheme encompassing three equal pools of mandates, each pool to represent a specific organic body of the society: families, syndicates and other organisations. Electoral curias choosing their representatives were named accordingly as Tercio Familiar, Tercio Sindical and Tercio de Entidades (also named Tercio Corporativo).

Municipal electoral regime

The term of a councillor was six years, yet the elections were organised every three years and covered only half of the mandates in every council. This stipulation was inherited from the Restoration era, but was welcome as it prevented drastic changes and ensured a sense of continuity. Each voter was permitted to choose as many candidates as many mandates were available. A voter had to cast his/her ballot in person and only in his/her constituency; voting by post was not allowed. The mayor (alcalde) was appointed by the minister of interior in case of provincial capitals and by civil governor in case of other municipalities.  The alcalde did not have to be a councillor; the only requirements were that he is Spanish and above 25 years of age.  This model changed in the legislation adopted few days before the death of Franco, which stipulated that alcaldes were to be elected by the councillors.

Number of mandates available

In line with general division into three equal tercios, number of mandates available for every council was the multiplication of three. The number of mandates available for council depended upon the number of inhabitants in the municipality and ranged from three (municipality below 501 inhabitants) to six (501 to 2,000 inhabitants), nine (2,001 to 10,000 inhabitants), 12 (10,001 to 20,000 inhabitants), 15 (20,001 to 50,000 inhabitants), 18 (50,001 to 100,000 inhabitants), 21 (100,001 to 500,000 inhabitants) and 24 (above 500,000 inhabitants). Compared to older Republican and Restoration regulations the scheme reduced significantly the number of mandates; e.g. during the Second Republic the city of Palencia, then ca. 25,000 inhabitants, was entitled to a 24-member council, while in the 1940s and 1950s, when its population ranged from 35,000 to 48,000 inhabitants, it was entitled to a 15-member council.

Electoral rights

Electorate

The population entitled to vote in Tercio Familiar ranged from 7m in the 1940s to 18m in the 1970s, the increase resulting not only from demographic growth but also from extending the voting rights to married females. Until 1970, the electorate of Tercio Familiar represented some 45% of the entire adult population, estimated on basis of the number of Spaniards entitled to vote in the Francoist referendums; since 1970 the number grew to some 75%. Until the 1970s some 65% of adult males were entitled to vote, in case of females this number was 20%; since 1970 the percentage probably equalled this appropriate for males. In Tercio Sindical the number of those eligible to elect compromisarios is difficult to estimate, yet given the size of syndicalist bureaucracy it probably went into hundreds of thousands. The number of compromisarios, i.e. those who were actually electing the councillors, is estimated for the whole Spain as hovering around 50,000; in 1948 in Madrid their number was 2,187. In Tercio de Entidades the number of voters equalled the number of mandates available in two other tercios and remained in the range of few thousand. Some individuals, mostly married working males, were entitled to participate in election process in all three tercios: in Tercio Familiar personally, in Tercio Sindical by electing compromisarios, and in Tercio de Entidades by electing councillors in two other tercios who acted as compromisarios.

Turnout

Technically taking part in elections was obligatory, though sanctions for absenteeism were low and their application rather exceptional.  This schizophrenic position of the authorities is summarised by a present day-scholar, who notes that the entire system was constructed to discourage mobilisation, but prior to the very day propaganda did everything to ensure largest possible turnout.  Actual turnout is subject to estimates, as official data is widely believed to be manipulated. Scholarly works suggest a decreasing trend, with 80% in the early 1950s, 55–65% in the 1960s and below 50% in the 1970s.  Apart from fundamental political issues - like refusal to participate in the Francoist political system - other factors quoted as responsible for decreasing turnout were complex electoral system, perceived limited role of elected ayuntamientos and suspicions of electoral fraud.

Manipulation and fraud

The election system contained many in-built features which enabled manipulation. The key one was the right of civil governors to appoint candidates in Tercio de Entidades in case their overall number was lower than three times the number of mandates available; given the councillors from this tercio were elected by councillors already elected from two other tercios, candidates proposed by authorities were virtually ensured mandate and the pool was at times dubbed "tercio de consolación". The similar mechanism was employed in case of Tercio Sindical, though this time it was Junta Local entitled to suggest own candidates. Notorious Article 29 was inherited from the Restoration system; in case the number of candidates in Tercio Familiar was lower than or equal to the number of mandates, the candidates were declared victorious with no balloting taking place. Most of the electoral process was technically handled by Falange/Movimiento.

Loopholes

Occasionally, candidates openly hostile to the Francoist State managed to gain seats in local councils; it was the case especially during late Francoism. Usually these were either single individuals or a tiny minority in the ayuntamiento; as such they posed little threat and the state did not intervene, e.g. in 1970 two candidates marked by the police as "oposición" were elected and confirmed in Seville. At times and in minor locations even candidates known as Communists got their tickets validated, like a party militant elected from tercio familiar in Lorca in 1971. However, at times the administration intervened; in 1973 a tercio familiar left-wing candidate from Barcelona found his electoral victory annulled by Junta Municipal del Censo. Only in few cases opposition bid caused serious problems for the state. This was the case of Pamplona, where since the late 1940s the Carlists posed a constant threat to the official monopoly. Following 1973 elections all seats from tercio familiar pool were seized by the opposition, with seats from the other tercios also contested; the civil governor intervened and judicial decision was pending for several of the council members.

Electoral campaigns

In the Francoist system choosing local governing bodies was not presented as politics, either big or small; instead, it was staged as part of the administrative process. Accordingly, candidatures were usually formatted as non-confrontational and the electorate was simply supposed to choose between these more and less competent. Official lists of candidates was made public only seven days prior to the election day, which rendered mounting and staging an individual electoral campaign extremely difficult. Once the candidates were known local press used to present them, usually adhering to a non-partisan tone and refraining from promoting some contenders over the others.

Role and impact within the system

A present-day scholar summarises the Francoist municipal electoral system as "leafy legislative tangle", a conglomerate of shady rules developed at various stages and serving various ends. As a whole it was designed as means of ensuring some efficiency of governance at the local level combined with contributing to political stability of Francoist Spain in the general perspective. The former was to be achieved by non-confrontational format, detachment from politics and efficient interface with local entities. The latter was to be achieved by overall bureaucratic control with a number of means available to manipulate the election result. Throughout all of the Francoist period local elections worked mostly as they were designed to. However, if the objective was also to forge some sort of identification with the state and ensure sustainable level of mobilisation, they probably failed.

See also

 Francoism
 Corporatism
 Falangism

Footnotes

Further reading

 Montserrat Duch Plana, Falangismo y personal político en los ayuntamientos españoles, [in:] II Encuentro de Investigadores del Franquismo, Alicante 1995, pp. 117–126
 Domingo García Ramos, Las elecciones municipales del franquismo, [in:] Pilar Sánchez Castro et al. (eds.), El franquismo: el régimen y la oposición, Guadalajara 2000, pp. 253–270
 Martí Marín i Corbera, Franquisme i poder local. Construcció i consolidació deIs ajuntaments feixistes a Catalunya, 1938-1949, [in:] Recerques 31 (1995), pp. 37–52
 Miguel Martínez Cuadrado, Representación. Elecciones. Referéndum, [in:] Manuel Fraga et al. (eds.), La Españia de los años 70 vol. III/1, Madrid 1974, pp. 1371–1439
 Antonio Martínez Marín, La representatividad municipal española. Historia legislativa y régimen vigente, Murcia 1989, 
 José Antonio Miranca Encarnación, Juan Francisco Pérez Ortíz, Actitudes falangistas ante las elecciones municipales (1948-1957), [in:] Anales de la Universidad de Alicante. Historia Contemporánea 8-9 (1991–92), pp. 139–147
 Roque Moreno Fonseret, La presencia de los grupos políticos en el régimen de Franco a través de las elecciones municipales de 1948, [in:] Javier Tusell (ed.), Estudios sobre la derecha espaiiola contemporánea, Madrid 1993, pp. 613–626
 Miguel Angel Ruiz de Azúa Antón, Las elecciones franquistas, [in:] Historia 16 (1977), pp. 85–94
 Julio Ponce, Carlos Sánchez, Difficult Years in the Ayuntamientos, 1969-1979. The Transition to Democracy in Spanish Municipalities, [in:] Bulletin for Spanish and Portuguese Historical Studies 36/1 (2011), pp. 110–129
 Jordi Solé Tura, Elecciones municipales y estructura del poder político en España, [in:] Estudios de Ciencia Política y Sociología-Homenaje al profesor Carlos Ollero, Madrid, 1972, pp. 785–799
 Juan de Esteban (ed.), El proceso electoral, Barcelona 1977

Francoist Spain
Municipal elections in Spain